Njomza Vitia (born 22 April 1994), known professionally as Njomza, is an American singer and songwriter. She is currently signed with Capitol, Motown, and SinceThe80s. Since 2013, she has released one mixtape and three EPs.

Life and career 

Njomza Vitia was born to Kosovo Albanian parents in Chicago, Illinois, where she grew up. Her father, Faik Vitia, and her mother, Sheki Vitia (née Haziri) are from Pristina, Kosovo. Her parents left Kosovo in 1992. She has an older sister. As a child, Njomza was introduced to R&B music through her sister, and began listening to rock and pop rock music during middle school.

Njomza began her career in music as the front woman for an alternative band called Scarlett.  The band had a strong following and played Warped Tour in 2010.  Once the band dismantled in 2011, Njomza went on to pursue her career as a solo artist.  She posted cover versions on YouTube of Mac Miller, Kid Cudi, and various other artists. She was discovered by Mac Miller, who signed her to his Warner Bros. Records imprint, REMember Music.

She also co-wrote Ariana Grande's songs "7 Rings" and "Thank U, Next".

Discography

Extended plays

Mixtapes

References 

1994 births
American women singer-songwriters
American people of Albanian descent
American people of German descent
American people of Kosovan descent
Living people
Singers from Chicago
Singer-songwriters from Illinois
21st-century American singers